Gerda Uhlemann (née Mittenzwei; born 22 February 1945) is a German former athlete. She competed in the women's pentathlon at the 1968 Summer Olympics.

References

External links
 

1945 births
Living people
Athletes (track and field) at the 1968 Summer Olympics
German pentathletes
Olympic athletes of East Germany
People from Hochtaunuskreis
Sportspeople from Darmstadt (region)